John Wilkinson (1876–1948) was an English cricketer who played ten first-class matches for Gloucestershire. Eight of these came in the period between 1899 and 1902, but after a long gap he played two more games in 1920.

References
John Wilkinson from CricketArchive

1876 births
1948 deaths
English cricketers
Gloucestershire cricketers
Sportspeople from Weymouth
Cricketers from Dorset